Robert Wallace Forster Jr. (July 13, 1941 – October 11, 2019) was an American actor, known for his roles as John Cassellis in Medium Cool (1969), Captain Dan Holland in The Black Hole (1979), Abdul Rafai in The Delta Force (1986), and Max Cherry in Jackie Brown (1997), for which he was nominated for the Academy Award for Best Supporting Actor. 

Forster's varied filmography includes: Reflections in a Golden Eye (1967), Alligator (1980), Me, Myself & Irene (2000), Mulholland Drive (2001), The Descendants (2011), Olympus Has Fallen (2013), London Has Fallen (2016), What They Had (2018), and The Wolf of Snow Hollow (2020).

He also had prominent roles in television series such as Banyon (1971–1973), Heroes (2007–2008), Twin Peaks (2017) and the Breaking Bad episode "Granite State" as Ed Galbraith, for which he won the Saturn Award for Best Guest Starring Role on Television. He reprised the role in the film El Camino: A Breaking Bad Movie (2019) and Better Call Saul.

Early life 
Forster was born and raised in Rochester, New York. His mother was Italian American, while his father was of English and Irish descent. The couple divorced in 1949. 

Forster added an "R" to his surname as there was another member of the Screen Actors Guild named Robert Foster.

Career 
After acclaimed supporting performances in two major Hollywood films, one as Private Williams in John Huston's Reflections in a Golden Eye (1967), another as part-Indian Army scout Nick Tana in Robert Mulligan's The Stalking Moon (1968), Forster starred in the critically acclaimed film Medium Cool (1969). After starring roles in the television series Banyon (1972) and Nakia (1974), he played mostly supporting roles in action and horror films including Disney's The Black Hole (1979). Forster had lead roles in cult B-movies in the 1980s like Alligator (1980), Vigilante (1983), The Delta Force (1986), and The Banker (1989).

Forster appeared in Jackie Brown as the character Max Cherry, which earned him a nomination for the Academy Award for Best Supporting Actor in 1997. Jackie Brown revitalized Forster's career, an effect that occurred for many actors appearing in Quentin Tarantino films. He subsequently had consistent work in the film industry, appearing in Like Mike, Mulholland Drive, Me, Myself & Irene, Lucky Number Slevin, and Firewall. He appeared in the made-for-television movie The Hunt for the BTK Killer, as the detective intent on capturing serial killer Dennis Rader. Forster also played the father of Van on the short-lived Fox series Fastlane.

Forster recorded a public service announcement for Deejay Ra's Hip-Hop Literacy campaign, encouraging reading of books by Elmore Leonard. He starred in the movie adaptation of Leonard's book Rum Punch, filmed as Jackie Brown.

He appeared in the hit NBC series Heroes as Arthur Petrelli, the father of Nathan and Peter Petrelli, as well as the Emmy Award-winning AMC crime drama Breaking Bad as Walter White's new identity specialist Ed Galbraith (a role he reprised in El Camino: A Breaking Bad Movie and Better Call Saul). He played Bud Baxter, father to Tim Allen's Mike Baxter, on the ABC (later Fox) hit comedy Last Man Standing. Forster was also a motivational speaker.

He was the first choice to play Sheriff Harry S. Truman in David Lynch's Twin Peaks, but had to turn it down due to a prior commitment to a different television pilot, and was replaced by Michael Ontkean. He appeared in Lynch's Mulholland Drive, a pilot for a TV series that was not picked up but was later turned into a critically acclaimed movie, and finally appeared in Twin Peaks, playing the brother of Sheriff Harry S. Truman, Sheriff Frank Truman, in Twin Peaks: The Return, when Ontkean was not available to reprise his role. About this, Forster said: "David Lynch, what a good guy he is. He wanted to hire me for the original, 25 years ago, for a part, and I was committed to another guy for a pilot that never went. So I didn't do the original Twin Peaks, which would have been a life-changer. It's a gigantic hit if you remember those years, a phenomenon. But I didn't do that. [...] And this time, I got a call from my agents and they said, David Lynch is going to call you. When he called me five minutes later, he said, "I'd like you to come and work with me again." And I said, 'Whatever it is David, here I come!'"

After Forster's death, he appeared posthumously in El Camino: A Breaking Bad Movie, reprising the character of Ed the "Disappearer" from the Breaking Bad series. He died on the day the movie was released. Four months later, Forster again appeared posthumously as Ed in one episode of the fifth season of Better Call Saul. The episode ended with a dedication to "our friend Robert Forster." He also appeared in an episode of the rebooted Amazing Stories television series before his death; the episode was dedicated to Forster.

Personal life and death 
Forster was married to June (née Provenzano) from May 14, 1966, to September 20, 1975, after meeting at their alma mater, the University of Rochester. The marriage produced three daughters, Elizabeth (born 1967), Kathrine "Kate" (born 1969) and Maeghen (born 1972). He was married to Zivia Forster from 1978 to 1980. He also had a son, Robert III (born 1965), from a previous relationship. From 2004 to the time of his death, his longtime partner was Denise Grayson. He was a member of the high-IQ Triple Nine Society.

In June 2019, Forster was diagnosed with a brain tumor, and he died from the disease at his home in Los Angeles on October 11, 2019, at the age of 78.

Filmography

Film

Television

Theater

Awards and nominations

References

Further reading 
 Voisin, Scott, Character Kings: Hollywood's Familiar Faces Discuss the Art & Business of Acting. BearManor Media, 2009. .

External links 

 
 
 
 
 DVD Talk Interview
 House Petrelli Interview 12/08, Part 1

1941 births
2019 deaths
20th-century American male actors
21st-century American male actors
American male film actors
American male television actors
American people of English descent
American people of Irish descent
American people of Italian descent
Deaths from brain cancer in the United States
Deaths from cancer in California
Neurological disease deaths in California
Male actors from Rochester, New York
University of Rochester alumni